Rebecca Elizabeth Sauerbrunn (born June 6, 1985) is an American professional soccer player for Portland Thorns FC of the National Women's Soccer League (NWSL), the highest division of women's professional soccer in the United States. Since 2021, Sauerbrunn is the captain of the United States women's national soccer team. She previously captained Utah Royals FC and, from 2016 to 2018, co-captained the national team with Carli Lloyd.

Sauerbrunn played collegiate soccer with the Virginia Cavaliers from 2003 to 2007. She has previously played professional soccer for Utah Royals FC, FC Kansas City, Washington Freedom, Røa IL, magicJack, and D.C. United. While with FC Kansas City, she won two NWSL Championships.

Sauerbrunn won gold with the national team at the 2012 London Summer Olympics, 2015 FIFA Women's World Cup, and 2019 FIFA Women's World Cup and she played for the team at the 2011 FIFA Women's World Cup where the U.S. finished in second place. She made one appearance during the 2011 FIFA Women's World Cup, playing during the semifinal match, a 3–1 win against France. She was a starting player for the United States at the 2015 FIFA Women's World Cup, playing every minute of all seven matches for the team.

Early life
Born to Jane and Scott Sauerbrunn in St. Louis, Missouri, Becky was raised with two older brothers, Grant and Adam. Growing up, her brothers motivated her to step up for herself and become physically and mentally tough.

Sauerbrunn played with the JB Marine Soccer Club beginning at age 12. She helped the team win the Missouri State Cup four times as well as a Midwest Regional Championship in 2000.

Sauerbrunn attended Ladue High School, where she was a four-year letter winner in soccer, volleyball and basketball. She was named soccer team captain playing as a sweeper and central midfielder. During her senior season, she scored 21 goals and made 19 assists. She was named 2003 Missouri Gatorade Player of the Year, 2002 and 2003 Parade All-American, 2001 NSCAA Youth All-American, and 2002 NSCAA Adidas (U-17) All-American.

University of Virginia, 2003–2007
Sauerbrunn attended the University of Virginia and was a member of the Virginia Cavaliers women's soccer team from 2003 to 2007.

In her freshman season in 2003, Sauerbrunn played in every game for the Cavaliers, starting all 21 of her appearances. In her 1,970 minutes played, she made two assists. Her first career assist came during a match against Wake Forest on October 11. In the first round of the 2003 NCAA Women's Soccer Tournament, Virginia faced William & Mary on November 14. Virginia won the match in penalty kicks and advanced to the second round. In the second round, Virginia faced Villanova on November 16 and lost the match in penalty kicks, halting their advancement in the tournament. Following the 2003 season, Sauerbrunn received NSCAA All-Region honors, NSCAA All-American First Team honors, All-ACC Second Team honors, and ACC All-Freshman Team honors. She was also named ACC Freshman of the Year for 2003.

Sauerbrunn missed the entire 2004 season due to national team obligations at the 2004 FIFA U-20 Women's World Championships in Thailand.

In the 2005 season, Sauerbrunn played in every game for the Cavaliers, starting all 25 of her appearances. She scored her first career goal with the Cavaliers on September 16 against St. Bonaventure. Virginia went on to win the match 7–1. In her 2,289 minutes played, she made one goal and two assists. In the first round of the 2005 NCAA Women's Soccer Tournament, Virginia faced Liberty on November 11. Virginia won the match 4–0 and advanced to the second round. In the second round, Virginia faced Tennessee on November 13. Virginia won the match 3–0 and advanced to the third round. Virginia faced CS Fullerton in the third round and won the game 2–1. In the quarterfinals, Virginia was defeated by UCLA on November 25. Following the 2005 season, Sauerbrunn received NSCAA All-Region honors and All-ACC Second Team honors. She was also named to the ACC All-Academic Team.

In the 2006 season, Sauerbrunn played in every game for the Cavaliers, starting all 21 of her appearances. In the 2006 NCAA Women's Soccer Tournament, Sauerbrunn helped Virginia make it to the third round, where they lost to Texas A&M on November 17. Following the 2006 season, Sauerbrunn received NSCAA All-Region honors, All-ACC First Team honors, and NSCAA All-American Second Team Honors. She was also named to the ACC All-Academic Team.

In the 2007 season, Sauerbrunn played in every game for the Cavaliers, starting all 23 of her appearances. In her 2,232 minutes played, she made one goal and three assists. In the 2007 NCAA Women's Soccer Tournament, Sauerbrunn helped Virginia make it to the third round, where they lost to UCLA in overtime on November 23. Following the 2007 season, Sauerbrunn received NSCAA All-Region honors, NSCAA All-American First Team Honors, and All-ACC First Team honors. She made the Academic All-American team, the ACC All-Tournament Team, and the ACC All-Academic Team. She was named NSCAA Scholar-Athlete of the Year and ACC Player of the Year.

Club career

Boston Renegades, 2005 
Sauerbrunn played for the Boston Renegades in the W-League in 2005. The W-League was often used by college players as a summer playing option because of its status as an open league, allowing college players to maintain eligibility. She made her first appearance for the team on May 20, 2005, against the Long Island Riders.

Richmond Kickers Destiny, 2006–2007 
Sauerbrunn played for the Richmond Kickers Destiny in the W-League for the 2006 and 2007 seasons. In her two seasons with the team, Sauerbrunn made 24 appearances, playing 2,137 minutes. Although she was mainly a defensive player, she also made three goals in her time with the team.

Washington Freedom, 2008–2009 
Sauerbrunn played for the Washington Freedom in the W-League for the 2008 season.

The Washington Freedom joined the newly formed Women's Professional Soccer league for the 2009 season. On October 6, 2008, Sauerbrunn was picked third overall in the first round of the 2008 WPS General Draft, which assigned the WPS rights of international and domestic players to the teams in the WPS for the 2009 season. Sauerbrunn made her first appearance for the team on March 29, 2009, in a match against the Los Angeles Sol. She started all 20 games for the Freedom in the regular season and in the team's one playoff match. She made one goal during the season in the 54th minute of the match against the Chicago Red Stars on April 11.

Røa IL, 2009 
Following the 2009 season with the Washington Freedom, Sauerbrunn played for Røa IL for three months in Norway in Toppserien, the top level professional league for women in Norway. She made her first appearance for the team on September 26, 2009, in a match against Kattem IL, where she played all 90 minutes and scored a goal in the 13th minute. She made five appearances for Røa IL in the domestic league. Røa were confirmed as league champions on the last day of the season after drawing 0–0 with Stabæk on October 31, a match in which Sauerbrunn started. She then went on to play in two rounds of UEFA Women's Champions League against Everton and Zvezda 2005 Perm, helping Røa advance to the quarterfinals.

Washington Freedom, 2010 
Sauerbrunn returned to the Freedom for the 2010 WPS season. She played in all 24 games of the regular season for the Freedom. At the end of the regular season, the Freedom ranked fourth in the league and advanced to the playoffs. The Freedom faced the Philadelphia Independence in the first round of the playoffs on September 19. Sauerbrunn started the match and played all 120 minutes, which ended in a 1–0 defeat for the Freedom.

magicJack, 2011 
On December 2, 2010, Dan Borislow bought the Washington Freedom, changed its name to magicJack and relocated the team to Boca Raton, Florida for the 2011 season. Sauerbrunn remained with the team after the change and made a start in the team's first appearance under the new name on April 23, 2011, against the Boston Breakers, a 1–0 win. She made 13 total appearances for the team in the regular season. magicJack ended the season ranked third in the league and advanced to the playoffs. On August 17, Sauerbrunn appeared in magicJack's match against the Boston Breakers in the first round of the playoffs. magicJack won 3–1 and they advanced to the semifinals. Sauerbrunn started in the semifinal match against Philadelphia Independence, a 2–0 defeat for magicJack.

On October 25, 2011, the WPS Board of Governors voted to terminate the magicJack franchise, accusing Borislow of violations ranging from "unprofessional and disparaging treatment of his players to failure to pay his bills." All players were released and became free agents on November 9, 2011.

Sky Blue FC, 2012 
Sauerbrunn signed with Sky Blue FC for the 2012 season. However, on January 30, 2012, the WPS Board of Governors voted to suspend the 2012 season because of an ongoing legal dispute with Borislow following the termination of magicJack. The league officially folded in May of the same year.

D.C. United Women, 2012 
In March 2012, following the suspension of the 2012 WPS season, Sauerbrunn signed with D.C. United Women in the W-League for the 2012 season. She helped the team finish first place in the Eastern Conference but was unable to appear in any playoff matches due to her national team obligations at the 2012 Summer Olympics in London.

FC Kansas City, 2013–2017 
A new professional league, the National Women's Soccer League, was announced in November 2012. On January 11, 2013, Sauerbrunn was allocated to FC Kansas City via the NWSL Player Allocation, which distributed national team players from the United States, Canada, and Mexico to teams within in the NWSL. She was one of three members of the United States women's national team that was allocated to FC Kansas City, along with Nicole Barnhart and Lauren Holiday.

For the 2013 season, Sauerbrunn as named co-captain along with Holiday. Sauerbrunn made her first appearance in the team's season opener against the Portland Thorns on April 14, 2013. She went on to make a total of 19 appearances for the team in the regular season in 2013, starting all 19. She helped Kansas City finish second in the league behind the Western New York Flash. On August 24, Sauerbrunn played all 120 minutes of the semifinal match against the Portland Thorns, which ended in a 3–2 defeat for Kansas City in overtime. Sauerbrunn was awarded Defender of the Year for the 2013 season. She was also named to the 2013 NWSL Best XI.

In the 2014 season, she once again served as co-captain with Holiday. Sauerbrunn started all 22 of her appearances in the regular season, playing a total of 1935 minutes and made one goal. She scored the first goal in her career with the NWSL on July 30 against the Washington Spirit. She helped Kansas City finish second in the league behind Seattle Reign FC. On August 23, Kansas City faced the Portland Thorns in the semifinals. Sauerbrunn played all 90 minutes of the match, which ended in a 2–0 win for Kansas City. Sauerbrunn then helped Kansas City defeat Seattle Reign in the championship match on August 31. Sauerbrunn was awarded Defender of the Year for the 2014 season. She was also named to the 2014 NWSL Best XI.

Sauerbrunn made 11 appearances for FC Kansas City in the 2015 season, missing nine regular season games due to national team obligations at the 2015 FIFA Women's World Cup. She helped Kansas City finish third in the league and advance to the playoffs. Sauerbrunn played all 90 minutes of the semifinal match against Chicago Red Stars on September 13, a 3–0 win for Kansas City. Sauerbrunn then helped Kansas City defeat Seattle Reign in the championship match on October 1. Sauerbrunn was awarded Defender of the Year for the 2015 season and became the first player in NWSL history to win a league award three years in a row. She was also named to the 2015 NWSL Best XI for the third time.

Utah Royals FC, 2018–2019 
After FCKC ceased operations, her rights were transferred to Utah. Sauerbrunn was named to the NWSL Team of the Month for March, April, May and June. She was named to the NWSL Best XI for the sixth consecutive season, and was named a finalist for Defender of the Year.

Portland Thorns FC, 2020– 
In March 2020, Sauerbrunn was officially traded to Portland Thorns FC.

International career

Youth national teams 
In 1999, Sauerbrunn attended the United States U-14 Girl's National Team Identification Camp.

U-16 national team
Sauerbrunn represented the United States as a member of the U-16 women's national team from 2000 to 2002. In 2001, Sauerbrunn was on the U-16 national team that competed in the United States Amateur Soccer Festival from July 29 to August 5. During the festival, Sauerbrunn appeared in a match against an older East Region Team on July 30 that ended in a 0–0 draw and a match against the West Region Team on August 1 that ended in a 5–1 win. On August 3, Sauerbrunn appeared in a match against Mexico's U-18 national team. She also appeared in the team's final match in the festival against the USASA National Select Team on August 5, which ended in a 2–2 draw. In March 2002, Sauerbrunn was on the roster for a series of three matches at the IMG Academy in Bradenton, Florida. She was then named to the roster for a three game series in Houston in July and August.

U-19 national team
In 2003, Sauerbrunn moved up to the U-19 national team and started off the year at the ARCO U.S. Olympic Training Center in San Diego, California from January 18 to 26. In February, Sauerbrunn was on the roster for a two-game series with the full Mexican women's national team. She then joined the team once again for a nine-day training camp at the ARCO Olympic Training Center in April. While there, the team played a match against the San Diego Spirit. Sauerbrunn traveled with the U-19 national team to Spring, Texas for the USYS Cup from May 24 to June 1. Sauerbunn started in the first match of the tournament against Canada on May 27 in a 6–1 win. Following the USYS Cup, Sauerbrunn joined the U-19 national team on a trip to Europe that involved three matches on July 2, July 5, and July 9.

The team gathered one last time for the year for a training camp from December 27 to January 2 at the U.S. Soccer's National Training Center at The Home Depot Center in Carson, California. Sauerbrunn was on the 26-player roster for the training camp. Shortly after, in 2004, Sauerbrunn joined the team for another training camp from January 23 to February first at The Home Depot Center.

Sauerbrunn was named to the 18-player roster for a two-game series against the full Mexican women's national team on February 18 and 20. Following the matches, she trained with the U-19 team at The Home Depot Center in Carson, California.

Sauerbrunn was a member of the U-19 national team that played in the Philips Lighting U-19 Women's Soccer Invitational, their first major domestic tournament, from April 6 to 10. In the first match of the tournament against Holland on April 6, Sauerbrunn made an appearance and helped the United States win 2–0. On April 8, Sauerbrunn started in the team's first-ever loss to another U-19 team in the match against Japan. She made an appearance during the team's final match against China on April 10. The match was a 4–0 win, giving the United States a second-place finish in the invitational.

On April 28, Sauerbrunn was named to the 18-player roster that would represent the United States at the CONCACAF U-19 Women's Qualifying Tournament held in Ottawa, Ontario and Montreal, Quebec, in Canada. She was co-captain of the team and led the team's defense. Sauerbrunn started in the team's opening match against the Dominican Republic on May 28 for a 14–0 win. She then started in the game against Trinidad & Tobago on May 30. The United States won the match 11–1, guaranteeing their spot in the semifinals. She appeared once again on June 1 during the team's final group match against Costa Rica, which ended in a 0–0 draw. In the semifinal match against Mexico on June 4, Sauerbrunn helped secure the United States U-19 women's national team a place in the 2004 FIFA U-19 Women's World Championship with a 6–0 win, although they still had one more match in the tournament. Sauerbrunn started in the final against Canada on June 6. Canada won the match in overtime.

Sauerbrunn trained with the U-19 national team during their first training camp following the CONCACAF Qualifying Tournament. The training took place in from July 7 to 18 in New Jersey. Leading up to the FIFA U-19 Women's World Championship held in November, Sauerbrunn joined the U-19 team for another training at the U.S. Soccer's National Training Center at The Home Depot Center in Carson, California in late August.

Sauerbrunn did not play with the University of Virginia Cavaliers for the 2004 season in order to train with the U-19 team leading up to the U-19 World Championship in a modified residency program. In the two months leading up to the championship, the team trained together in two-week blocks until they left for the tournament in November.

On October 12, Sauerbrunn was named to the 21-player roster that would represent the United States at the 2004 FIFA U-19 Women's World Championship in Thailand. Sauerbrunn was co-captain of the team and played every minute in all six matches of the tournament for the United States.

In the opening group match against South Korea on November 11, Sauerbrunn helped the United States post a shut out victory with a 3–0 win. On November 14, she started in the match against Russia. One goal made it through the defense and the United States won 4–1. In the team's final group match on November 18, Sauerbrunn helped the United States defeat Spain in a 1–0 victory. The United States was the only team to win all three of its group matches. In the quarterfinals, Sauerbrunn helped the United States advance with a 2–0 win over Australia. The United States moved into the semifinals, where Sauerbrunn started in the match against Germany on November 24. The Germans took the win and halted the United States' advancement in the tournament. The United States faced Brazil in the third place match, where Sauerbrunn played all 90 minutes. The United States won the game 3–0 and took away third place. Sauerbrunn was subsequently named to the Tournament All-Star Team by the FIFA Technical Study Group.

U-21/U-23 national team 
Following the 2004 FIFA U-19 Women's World Championship, Sauerbrunn joined the U-21 national team for a training camp in 2005 at the U.S. Soccer National Team Training Center from March 26 to April 3 in preparation for the 2005 Nordic Cup. She trained with the team once again in late May in the largest training camp in the women's national team history. She was not named to the roster for the 2005 Nordic Cup in July.

In 2006, Sauerbrunn trained with the U-21 national team from March 19 to 24 at The Home Depot Center in preparation for the 2006 Nordic Cup. She was not named to the roster for the 2006 Nordic Cup in July.

Sauerbrunn traveled to Germany with the U-21 national team from May 18 to 27 for three matches against Gutersloh, SG Essen-Schönebeck, and 07 Bad Neuenahr in 2007. She then trained with the team in early June in Portland, Oregon in preparation for the 2007 Nordic Cup. Following the training camp, Sauerbrunn was named to the 18-player roster for the 2007 Nordic Cup roster held in late July in Vassa, Finland. Sauerbrunn came in during the 89th minute of the team's opening match in the tournament against Norway, a 1–0 win for the United States. She also appeared in the final minutes of the match on July 22 and helped the United States defeat Sweden to advance to the championship game. In the championship game, the United States faced Germany. Sauerbrunn came in for Ali Krieger in the 79th minute to help the United States win the match and the Nordic Cup title.

In 2008, the U-21 team changed to U-23 after the Nordic Cup was changed to a U-23 competition. Following her short time with the full national team in early 2008, Sauerbrunn joined the now U-23 national team at the La Manga Tournament in Spain. The United States placed second in the tournament after a 1–1 draw with Germany in their final match. Sauerbrunn then traveled with the team to England for two matches against the England U-23 national team. The first match took place on March 12 and Sauerbrunn made the start. The United States defeated England 1–0. Sauerbrunn started in the second match on March 14 and the United States won 2–0.

Sauerbrunn trained with the U-23 national team from June 5 to 12 at The Home Depot Center in preparation for the 2008 Nordic Cup. Sauerbrunn was subsequently named to the roster or the 2008 Nordic Cup held in late July. The United States won the Nordic Cup championship after defeating Germany on July 21.

Senior National Team

First Cap
Sauerbrunn was first called up to the United States women's national team for a six-day training camp at the Home Depot Center in Carson, California from January 3 to 8 in 2008. Following the training camp, she was named to the roster for the Four Nations Tournament in China. During the tournament, she earned her first cap against Canada on January 16, which she started. Sauerbrunn trained with the national team again in February 2008. She then went back down to the U-23 team.

Return to the national team, 2010
In late September 2010, Sauerbrunn made her return to the national team when she was called into a national team training camp in Atlanta to replace Joanna Lohman, who was recovering from an ankle injury. Immediately following the 20-day training camp, Saeurbrunn was named to the 20-player roster for the 2010 CONCACAF Women's World Cup Qualifying tournament held from October 28 to November 8. With two caps, she had the least experience on the roster. She made one appearance during the tournament, coming in for Amy LePeilbet in the 56th minute of the match against Guatemala on October 30. The United States placed third in the tournament and a berth in a two-game series against Italy for the last spot in the 2011 FIFA Women's World Cup. Sauerbrunn was on the preliminary roster for the two matches.

2011 FIFA Women's World Cup
Sauerbrunn started off 2011 with the national team at a six-day training camp at The Home Depot Center in Carson, California from January 8 to 13. Following the training, Sauerbrunn was named to the 23-player roster for the 2011 Four Nations Tournament held in China. Sauerbrunn made her first start since 2008 during the tournament on January 23 in a match against Canada. She played all 90 minutes in the match, which ended in a 2–1 win for the United States. She also made an appearance during the match against China on January 25, helping the United States win the Four Nations Tournament.

Sauerbrunn joined the national team for a 32-player training camp in Florida that took place from February 3 to 9 in preparation for the 2011 Algarve Cup. Following the camp, Sauerbrunn was named to the 23-player roster for the Algarve Cup. Sauerbrunn came in during the second half in the match against Norway on March 4 as well as in the match against Finland on March 7. She started in the final against Iceland, helping the United States win the 2011 Algarve Cup title with a 4–2 win.

Sauerbrunn was named to the 23-player roster for a 20-day training camp in the United Kingdom in February and April. During the training camp, the United States played a match against England on April 2, although Sauerbrunn did not make an appearance.

From April 18 to May 6, Sauerbrunn joined the national team for a three-week training camp in Florida. On May 9, following the training camp, Sauerbrunn was named to the 21-player roster for the 2011 FIFA Women's World Cup. Sauerbrunn trained with the team in June for eight days in Austria before going to Germany for the World Cup. Sauerbrunn's one appearance during the tournament came during the semifinal against France on July 13. She replaced Rachel Buehler in the starting lineup, as she was serving a suspension and not eligible to play in the match. The United States won the match 3–1 and advanced to the final. The United States went on be defeated by Japan in the final.

Sauerbrunn trained with the national team for two weeks in November in Arizona leading into a match against Sweden on November 19. She was then named to 18-player game roster for the match against Sweden and made an appearance during the game. Following the match, Sauerbrunn was called up for an 18-day training camp in Carson, California at The Home Depot Center from December 3 to 20.

2012 Summer Olympics

Sauerbrunn trained with the national team during the first training camp of the year from January 7 to 15. Immediately following the camp, Sauerbrunn was named to the 20-player roster for the 2012 CONCACAF Women's Olympic Qualifying tournament from January 10 to 29 in Vancouver. She started in the final two group matches against Guatemala and Mexico on January and January 24, respectively. She also started in the final match against Canada on January 29, helping the United States win 4–0. Their first place finish gave them a berth to the 2012 Summer Olympics.

Following the 2012 CONCACAF Olympic Qualifying Tournament, Sauerbrunn joined a 28-player roster for a training camp in Frisco, Texas in the week leading up to a match against New Zealand on February 11. On February 17, Sauerbrunn was named to a 23-player roster that would travel to Portugal for the 2012 Algarve Cup. She was subsequently named to the roster of 21 players that would suit up for the matches of the tournament. Sauerbrunn made one appearance during the Algarve Cup, with a start in the match against Norway on March 2.

Sauerbrunn traveled to Japan with the national team for the Women's Kirin Challenge Cup in early April. She did not appear in the team's first match against Japan on April 1, but came in during the second half in the second match against Brazil on April 3, a 3–0 win. Following the tournament, she trained with the national team in Florida from April 18 to 30. She was then called up to a training camp in Princeton, New Jersey from May 10 to 25 in preparation for a match against China on May 27. She was subsequently named to the 18-player roster for the match and came in during the 62nd minute of the match, a 4–1 win for the United States.

On May 27, Sauerbrunn was one of the 18 players named to the team that would represent the United States at the 2012 Summer Olympics in London. The team, plus the four alternates, then traveled to Sweden for the Volvo Winners Cup, consisting of a match against Sweden on June 16 and Japan on June 18. Sauerbrunn came in during the second half of both matches.

Sauerbrunn made her Olympic debut on July 31, 2012, in a group match against Korea DPR. She came in for Rachel Buehler in the 75th minute. She also played in the final ten minutes of the semifinal match against Canada on August 6, a 4–3 win for the United States that sent them to the final. Sauerbrunn came in during the 80th minute of the match against Japan on August 9. The United States won the match 2–1, taking away the gold medal. In her three appearances in the tournament, Sauerbrunn played a total of 38 minutes. Following the Olympics, Sauerbrunn joined the national team on the Fan Tribute Tour.

2013–2014 
In 2013, Sauerbrunn was a consistent starter at the center-back position. She started 10 of her 12 appearances during 2013, playing a total of 940 minutes.

In January 2013, Sauerbrunn was called up to a 29-player training camp leading up to two matches against Scotland in early February. On February 21, Saeurbrunn was named to the 23-player roster for the 2013 Algarve Cup in Portugal that took place from March 6 to 13. Although she did not appear in the team's first match against Iceland on March 6, Sauerbrunn wore the captain's armband in her first appearance of the tournament on March 8 in a match against China. She also started in a match against Sweden on March 11 and came in during the 68th minute of the final match to help the United States win the Algarve Cup title.

Following the 2013 Algarve Cup, Sauerbrunn traveled to Europe with the national team for matches against Germany and the Netherlands in early April. She appeared during the match against the Netherlands on April 9, a 3–1 win for the United States. In late May, Sauerbrunn was named to the 21-player roster that traveled to Canada to train in preparation for a match against Canada on June 2. She did not appear in the match.

In 2014, Sauerbrunn made 22 appearances, starting 20, and played a total of 1,757 minutes. She started off the year at a national team training camp from January 8 to 15 at U.S. Soccer's National Training Center in Carson, California. Following the training camp, Sauerbrunn made her 50th appearance for the national team in a match against Canada on January 31 in Frisco, Texas. She was the 46th player in United States women's national team history to reach 50 caps.

On February 24, Sauerbrunn was named to the 24-player roster for the 2014 Algarve Cup that took place from March 5 to 12. She wore the captain's armband during the team's first match of the tournament on March 5 against Japan, a 1–1 draw. She also started in the match against Sweden on March 7, a game that ended the 43-game unbeaten streak for the United States. Sauerbrunn came in during the 62nd minute of the match against Denmark on March 10, a 5–3 defeat for the United States. Sauerbrunn started in the match against Korea DPR that secured their seventh place finish in the tournament.

Sauerbrunn joined the team for a two-game series against China in April. She started in both matches and wore the captain's armband in the second game on April 10. In late April, Sauerbrunn was named to a 22-player roster for a match against Canada on May 8. She played all 90 minutes in the match, which ended in a 1–1 draw. She was then named to the roster for two games against France on June 14 and 19. She started both matches. Sauerbrunn was named to a 19-player roster for a match against Switzerland on August 20 in Sandy, Utah. She started the match and was replaced by Julie Johnston in the second half. The United States went on the win 4–1.

Sauerbrunn joined the national team for a training camp at the end of August in order to prepare for two matches against Mexico in September as well as the 2014 CONCACAF Women's Qualifying tournament in October. She appeared in both games against Mexico and was subsequently named to the roster for the 2014 CONCACAF Women's Championship that served as a qualification for the 2015 FIFA Women's World Cup. Sauerbrunn made three appearances in the tournament. She started for the United States in their opening match against Trinidad & Tobago on October 15, which they won 1–0. She also appeared in the team's second group match against Guatemala on October 17, a 5–0 win for the United States. Her third appearance came during the final against Costa Rica on October 26, helping the United States win the tournament and qualify for the 2015 FIFA Women's World Cup.

Following the CONCACAF Qualifying tournament, Sauerbrunn was named to the 24-player roster for the International Tournament of Brasilia in Brazil that took place from December 10 to 21. Sauerbrunn started all four games of the tournament. She was named Budweiser Woman of the Match for the team's opening match against China, which resulted in a 1–1 draw. In the final against Brazil, Sauerbrunn made a header off of a corner kick by Megan Rapinoe, but the shot was saved by Luciana, Brazil's goalkeeper. The game was a 0–0 draw, but the tournament title was given to Brazil, who had more points from the group stage.

2015 FIFA Women's World Cup 

Sauerbrunn started all 25 matches for the United States in 2015, the only player to do so. She also had the most minutes played on the team with 2,184.

Sauerbrunn started off the year at a 21-day training camp in 2015 from January 5 to 25 at the U.S. Soccer National Training Center in Carson, California. Following the training camp, Sauerbrunn was named to the 24-player team that would travel on a 13-day trip to Europe for matches against France and England in mid-February. Sauerbrunn played all 90 minutes in the match against France on February 8. She made a key save in the opening minutes of the game and assisted in halting the opposing team's attack. She was subsequently named Budweiser Woman of the Match. She also played all 90 minutes in the match against England on February 13, which was a shutout victory for the United States.

On February 21, Sauerbrunn was named to the 25-player roster for the 2015 Algarve Cup in Portugal. She started all four of the matches for the United States and was named Budweiser Woman of the Match for the 0–0 draw against Iceland on March 9. She was then named to a 25-player roster on March 20 for a match against New Zealand on April 4 in St. Louis. She started in the match and played all 90 minutes, helping the United States defeat New Zealand 4–0.

On April 14, 2015, Sauerbrunn was named to the 23-player roster that would represent the United States at the 2015 FIFA Women's World Cup. She played every minute in all seven matches for the United States during the World Cup. Sauerbrunn became a World Cup Champion on July 5, when she helped the United States defeat Japan 5–2 in the Women's World Cup final. Sauerbrunn joined the national team on a Victory Tour following their World Cup win that started in Pittsburgh, Pennsylvania on August 16 and ended in New Orleans, Louisiana on December 16.

2016 Summer Olympics 
On January 9, 2016, Sauerbrunn was named captain of the United States women's national team along with Carli Lloyd.

Sauerbrunn joined the national team for their first training camp of the year at the U.S. Soccer National Training Center in Carson, California from January 5 to 21. She was then named to the 20-player roster for 2016 CONCACAF Women's Olympic Qualifying. The United States qualified to the 2016 Olympic Games in Rio de Janeiro after a semifinal win against Trinidad & Tobago on February 19. Sauerbrunn made her 100th appearance for the national team on February 21 in the final against Canada. During the match, she also made her third career assist. The United States won the tournament after defeating Canada 2–0. Following the tournament, Sauerbrunn was named to the 2016 CONCACAF Women's Olympic Qualifying Best XI.

Sauerbrunn was named to the roster for the 2016 SheBelieves Cup that took place from March 3 to 9. She started in the team's opening match of the tournament on March 3 against England. Sauerbrunn was noted for her good positioning during the match, helping block a shot in the 59th minute. She also made appearances in other two matches of the tournament, helping the United States win the 2016 SheBelieves Cup with a 2–1 win over Germany in their final game.

Sauerbrunn joined a 23-player roster for a training camp ahead of two matches against Colombia in early April. She appeared in both matches, but did not play all 90 minutes in either game. Sauerbrunn was on the roster for another two-game series against Japan in early June and she started in both games.

On July 12, 2016, Sauerbrunn was named to the 18-player team that would represent the United States at the 2016 Olympic Games in Rio de Janeiro. She made her first appearance in Rio on August 3 in the team's opening match against New Zealand. The match marked her first Olympic start and she was subsequently named the Woman of the Match. She also appeared in the second group match against France, helping the United States take away another victory and secure their first place finish in the group. Sauerbrunn played all 90 minutes of the team's final group match against Colombia on August 9, which ended in a 2–2 draw. In the quarterfinals, Sauerbrunn started in the match against Sweden on August 12. The game was tied 1–1 after both regulation time and extra time. The United States were then defeated by Sweden in penalty kicks.

2019 FIFA Women's World Cup
In May 2019, she was named to the final 23-player roster for the 2019 FIFA Women's World Cup. Sauerbrunn appeared in 6 of the 7 matches for the USWNT during the tournament, missing only the opening match vs Thailand. The United States went on to defeat the Netherlands 2–0 in the final, winning back-to-back World Cup titles and the fourth overall World Cup title for the United States women's national team.

Personal life
Sauerbrunn is in a relationship with Zola Short.

Player statistics

International summary

World Cup and Olympic appearances

Honors and awards

High school 
 NSCAA Youth All-American: 2001
 NSCAA Adidas (U-17) All-American: 2002
 Parade All-American: 2002, 2003
 Missouri Gatorade Player of the Year: 2003

College 
 Soccer Times All-American Third Team: 2003
 ACC Freshman of the Year: 2003
 ACC All-Freshman Team: 2003
 Soccer Buzz Mid-Atlantic Region Freshman of the Year: 2003
 Soccer Buzz National Freshman of the Year Finalist: 2003
 Soccer Buzz Freshman All-American First Team: 2003
 All-ACC Second Team: 2003, 2005
 Soccer Buzz All-American Second Team: 2003, 2007
 NSCAA All-American First Team: 2003, 2007
 Soccer Buzz All-American Honorable Mention: 2005
 NSCAA All-American Second Team: 2006
 Soccer Buzz All-American Third Team: 2006
 All-ACC First Team: 2006, 2007
 Academic All-American: 2007
 NSCAA Scholar-Athlete of the Year: 2007
 VaSID State Player of the Year: 2007
 ACC Player of the Year: 2007
 ACC All-Tournament Team: 2007
 ACC All-Academic Team: 2005, 2006, 2007
 NSCAA All-Region: 2003, 2005, 2006, 2007
 VaSID First Team All-State: 2003, 2005, 2006, 2007
 ACC Postgraduate Scholarship Award: 2008
FC Kansas City
 NWSL Championship: 2014, 2015

Portland Thorns FC
 NWSL Community Shield: 2020
 NWSL Challenge Cup: 2021
 International Champions Cup: 2021
 NWSL Shield: 2021
 NWSL Championship: 2022
United States
 FIFA Women's World Cup: 2015, 2019
 CONCACAF Women's Championship: 2010; 2014; 2018; 2022 
 CONCACAF Women's Olympic Qualifying Tournament: 2012; 2016; 2020
 Olympic Gold Medal: 2012
 Olympic Bronze Medal: 2020
 SheBelieves Cup: 2016; 2020, 2021; 2022, 2023
 Algarve Cup: 2011, 2013, 2015
 Four Nations Tournament: 2008, 2011
 Nordic Cup: 2007, 2008
 Tournament of Nations: 2018
Individual
 U.S. Soccer Athlete of the Year Nominee: 2015
 BBC Women's Footballer of the Year Nominee: 2016
 IFFHS CONCACAF Woman Team of the Decade 2011–2020

 CONCACAF W Championship Best XI: 2022
 NWSL Defender of the Year: 2013, 2014, 2015, 2019
 NWSL Best XI: 2013, 2014, 2015, 2016, 2017, 2018, 2019
 NWSL Second XI: 2022

In popular culture

Sauerbrunn was featured along with her national teammates in the EA Sports' FIFA video game series in FIFA 16, the first time women players were included in the game. In September 2015, she was ranked by EA Sports as the No. 10 women's player in the game.

Following the United States' win at the 2015 FIFA Women's World Cup, Sauerbrunn and her teammates became the first women's sports team to be honored with a Ticker Tape Parade in New York City. Each player received a key to the city from Mayor Bill de Blasio. In October of the same year, the team was honored by President Barack Obama at the White House.

In April 2016, it was announced that Sauerbrunn would appear in ads and a 225-foot mural in New York for Budweiser.

See also

References

Further reading
 Grainey, Timothy (2012), Beyond Bend It Like Beckham: The Global Phenomenon of Women's Soccer, University of Nebraska Press, 
 Lisi, Clemente A. (2010), The U.S. Women's Soccer Team: An American Success Story, Scarecrow Press, 
 Longman, Jere (2009), The Girls of Summer: The U.S. Women's Soccer Team and How it Changed the World, HarperCollins, 
 Seigerman, David (2017), Becky Sauerbrunn, Alladin, 
 Stevens, Dakota (2011), A Look at the Women's Professional Soccer Including the Soccer Associations, Teams, Players, Awards, and More, BiblioBazaar,

External links

 
 US Soccer player profile
 W-League player profile
 Virginia player profile
 2012 Summer Olympics profile
 FC Kansas City player profile
 

1985 births
Living people
2011 FIFA Women's World Cup players
2015 FIFA Women's World Cup players
2019 FIFA Women's World Cup players
American expatriate sportspeople in Norway
American expatriate women's soccer players
American people of German descent
American women's soccer players
Expatriate women's footballers in Norway
FC Kansas City players
FIFA Century Club
FIFA Women's World Cup-winning players
Footballers at the 2012 Summer Olympics
Footballers at the 2016 Summer Olympics
Footballers at the 2020 Summer Olympics
Ladue Horton Watkins High School alumni
MagicJack (WPS) players
Medalists at the 2012 Summer Olympics
National Women's Soccer League players
Olympic gold medalists for the United States in soccer
Portland Thorns FC players
Røa IL players
Soccer players from St. Louis
United States women's international soccer players
USL W-League (1995–2015) players
Utah Royals FC players
Virginia Cavaliers women's soccer players
Washington Freedom players
Women's association football defenders
Olympic bronze medalists for the United States in soccer
Medalists at the 2020 Summer Olympics
Women's Professional Soccer players
Boston Renegades players